The village of Hawkesville in Ontario, Canada is a small community in the township of Wellesley in the Regional Municipality of Waterloo. Several Mennonite families are located nearby.  Hawkesville is noted for its custom-built furniture industry.

History 

Though Wellesley Township itself was not surveyed until 1842 and was only incorporated in 1852, settlers were already long in this area. By 1805, many Mennonites from Pennsylvania had settled nearby in what became known as Berlin, and today as Kitchener. In 1837, the same year that  William Lyon Mackenzie's rebellion was defeated at York (now Toronto), John Philip Schweitzer from Germany squatted at what is now Hawkesville, and had  of land cleared over the following nine years. Then, John Hawke received government permission to buy the clearing for $700.00 on the condition that he build a grist mill (for flour) and a sawmill within two years. John Hawke, the second son of Benjamin Hawke and Mary (Lount), had arrived.

Benjamin Hawke was a United Empire Loyalist and a Quaker that fled military conflict in the United States to settle in Simcoe County. Though his wife's family, the Lounts, were also Quakers, his brother-in-law Samuel Lount was one of William Lyon Mackenzie's lieutenants in the 1837 revolt. After Samuel Lount was hanged for treason, Benjamin Hawke decided to move out of Simcoe County. When his son John received permission to purchase  in Waterloo County, Benjamin moved there with his wife, his four sons, and his seven daughters. The Hawkes arrived in 1846; John built the grist mill, his younger brother Piercifer built a sawmill, and "Hawke’s village" appeared on the Waterloo County map.

A post office was established in Hawkesville in 1852, operated by Gabriel Hawke. When the Waterloo County boundaries were established in 1852 to include the townships of Waterloo, Wellesley, Wilmot, Woolwich, and North Dumfries, John Hawke was named the first Reeve of Wellesley and the first township hall was built in Hawkesville. When the decision was being made for the location of a county seat, Hawkesville originally anticipated being chosen over Berlin and Galt. However, John Hawke had the deciding vote, and he cast it in favour of Berlin. With the railroad and the county seat, Berlin began to grow rapidly and kept on growing; Hawkesville flourished only until the end of the century before diminishing.

Records from 1864 indicate that the community of about 400 people had three stores, two woolen factories, a tannery, two wagon makers and some tradesmen. The school in Hawkesville had 100 students by that time. There were four churches, although two were still under construction in 1864. The 6th Division court held its hearings in this community.

Into the early 1900s, the village Carriage and wagon maker, George M. Diefenbacker (his preferred spelling) would entertain his grandson each summer, the late Prime Minister John G. Diefenbaker.

Because Hawkesville is located on a hill near the Conestogo River, it was too difficult to construct a railway to Hawkesville.

Churches

A Presbyterian congregation worshiped in town from 1868 to 1946. Their church building was dedicated as Hawkesville Mennonite Church on January 1, 1950.  Only the Hawkesville Mennonite Church and the Countryside Conservative Mennonite Fellowship remain in Hawkesville.

A United Brethren church also existed in Hawkesville from 1865 until 1904. The gothic windows and rafters are still visible inside the shop of Hawkwoods Custom Furniture.

Another group started meeting in 1931 and completed the building of a Gospel Hall next door to the village's cemetery in 1939. This group became the Hawkesville Bible Chapel, but their Hall became overcrowded and they moved into a new building in Wallenstein in 1968 where the Wallenstein Bible Chapel remains today.

Demographics 

Economy 

Hawkesville is home to several small and medium size businesses including the larger Frey Building Contractors and the Country Lane Builders.

Hawkesville is noted for its custom-built furniture industry. While many Mennonites in the surrounding area build and sell furniture, Hawkesville itself is home to three furniture businesses: Chervin Custom Woodworks, Hawkwoods Custom Furniture, and Homestead Woodworks.

Noah Martin's summer sausage was located in Hawkesville until his death.

Government 

Located in the Kitchener-Conestoga electoral riding, Hawkesville has been represented in Ottawa, since 2006, by the Conservative Member of Parliament, Harold Albrecht.

At Queen's Park in Toronto, Hawkesville has been represented since 2018 by the Progressive Conservative Member of Provincial Parliament, Mike Harris Jr.

Notable people
 Henry George Lackner, doctor and political figure
 Murray D. Martin, global business executive

Bibliography 
Ogram, Grace "Letter to the Hawkesville Cemetery" 30 July 1986. Waterloo-Wellington Branch, Ontario Genealogical Society
Dick, J. and Longo, M.  Heritage Driving Tour of Wellesley Township. Waterloo Regional Heritage Foundation, 1989.
"Hawkesville Village History." Hawkesville Walking Tour. Hawkesville Heritage Day, June 1991.

References

External links
 Wellesley Township

Communities in the Regional Municipality of Waterloo
Designated places in Ontario